Corey McKernan (born 19 December 1973) is a former Australian rules footballer who played for the North Melbourne Kangaroos and Carlton Blues in the Australian Football League (AFL). A dual Premiership player a one time All Australian at North Melbourne and one time club best and fairest winner and leading goal kicker at Carlton, McKernan was at one time considered to be one of the very best players in the country. He is the older brother to Shaun McKernan who played with Adelaide Crows, Essendon and St Kilda.

Early years
McKernan grew up in Melbourne's western suburbs and was recruited to North Melbourne from Westmeadows Football Club in the Essendon District Football League as a 197 cm, 105 kg mobile ruckman, prior to the 1993 AFL season. In his first season at AFL level, he played just one game, a loss to St Kilda in round 17.

North Melbourne

1994
The following year, 1994, McKernan had an impressive start to his AFL Career, after being elevated by coach Denis Pagan to the starting line up. He quickly gained a reputation as a mobile and agile ruckman who was a strong over head mark and potent part-time forward. At the end of the season he polled the most votes in the Norwich Rising Star award, but was ineligible to win the award due to a suspension he received earlier in the year.

1996
After another solid season in 1995 in which he continued to improve, McKernan took his game to new level in 1996. Alternating between the ruck and forward line, McKernan was dominant, often turning games with his high leap, ability to regularly take contested marks and long kicking. Not to be overshadowed by his superstar captain Wayne Carey, at season's end the AFL Players Association awarded him with the Most Valuable Player award (now known as the Leigh Matthews Trophy). Disappointingly for McKernan however, history repeated itself in 1996 when he polled the equal-most votes in the game's highest individual honour, the Brownlow Medal, but was ineligible to win the medal due to an earlier, questionable, suspension that season. North Melbourne went on to win the 1996 AFL Premiership, with McKernan typically magnificent in the Grand Final against Sydney, recording a career high 29 disposals in the Grand Final. To add to his list of honours, McKernan was named as first ruck in the All-Australian team and some experts had him ahead of teammate Carey as the best player in the league.

1997 to 1999
In Round 1 of 1997, Wayne Carey was seriously injured and missed the following 11 weeks. With Carey absent, McKernan in just his fourth full season, became the most important player at the club. Unfortunately, though still consistent and effective, he could not repeat his inspirational efforts of the previous year. In North Melbourne's Preliminary Final defeat against St Kilda, McKernan dislocated his shoulder in the opening minutes and watched from the sidelines as his team went down by 31 points. The following year was disappointing for both McKernan and the Kangaroos, however, 1999 became another premiership year for North Melbourne, as McKernan returned to some good form, leading the team in marks and kicking 34 goals from his 24 games. He finished the season with three goals in North Melbourne's 39-point Grand Final win over Carlton.

2000 and 2001
Later in his career McKernan became more of a forward and backup ruckman as Matthew Burton accepted most of the ruck duties for the Kangaroos. However, McKernan still finished second in the Kangaroos' goal kicking in both 2000 and 2001, with 40 and 38 goals respectively. He kicked a career high eight goals against Geelong in Round 19 of 2000 – a game in which he also claimed eight marks, with 23 disposals and 11 hit-outs.

Carlton
In 2002, McKernan was traded to Carlton where he played the next two seasons. His first season at Carlton was amongst his best since 1996. He led the Blues in hit outs and goals and claimed his first and only club best and fairest award.

Back to North Melbourne
After a disappointing 2003 at Carlton, McKernan returned to the Kangaroos for one last season in 2004, after which he retired due to injury and poor form.

Playing statistics

|- style="background-color: #EAEAEA"
! scope="row" style="text-align:center" | 1993
|
| 31 || 1 || 0 || 0 || 5 || 1 || 6 || 1 || 2 || 3 || 0.0 || 0.0 || 5.0 || 1.0 || 6.0 || 1.0 || 2.0 || 3.0
|-
! scope="row" style="text-align:center" | 1994
|
| 31 || 21 || 22 || 19 || 181 || 113 || 294 || 110 || 12 || 183 || 1.0 || 0.9 || 8.6 || 5.4 || 14.0 || 5.2 || 0.6 || 8.7
|- style="background-color: #EAEAEA"
! scope="row" style="text-align:center" | 1995
|
| 31 || 25 || 19 || 14 || 202 || 130 || 332 || 116 || 6 || 198 || 0.8 || 0.6 || 8.1 || 5.2 || 13.3 || 4.6 || 0.2 || 7.9
|-
! scope="row" style="text-align:center" | 1996
|
| 31 || 24 || 33 || 30 || 312 || 111 || 423 || 154 || 17 || 284 || 1.4 || 1.3 || 13.0 || 4.6 || 17.6 || 6.4 || 0.7 || 11.8
|- style="background-color: #EAEAEA"
! scope="row" style="text-align:center" | 1997
|
| 31 || 22 || 22 || 14 || 237 || 79 || 316 || 134 || 13 || 143 || 1.0 || 0.6 || 10.8 || 3.6 || 14.4 || 6.1 || 0.6 || 6.5
|-
! scope="row" style="text-align:center" | 1998
|
| 31 || 21 || 25 || 15 || 185 || 72 || 257 || 91 || 18 || 240 || 1.2 || 0.7 || 8.8 || 3.4 || 12.2 || 4.3 || 0.9 || 11.4
|- style="background-color: #EAEAEA"
! scope="row" style="text-align:center" | 1999
|
| 31 || 24 || 34 || 22 || 253 || 98 || 351 || 151 || 14 || 324 || 1.4 || 0.9 || 10.5 || 4.1 || 14.6 || 6.3 || 0.6 || 13.5
|-
! scope="row" style="text-align:center" | 2000
|
| 31 || 23 || 40 || 22 || 231 || 80 || 311 || 135 || 15 || 150 || 1.7 || 1.0 || 10.0 || 3.5 || 13.5 || 5.9 || 0.7 || 6.5
|- style="background-color: #EAEAEA"
! scope="row" style="text-align:center" | 2001
|
| 31 || 21 || 38 || 15 || 160 || 52 || 212 || 99 || 11 || 98 || 1.8 || 0.7 || 7.6 || 2.5 || 10.1 || 4.7 || 0.5 || 4.7
|-
! scope="row" style="text-align:center" | 2002
|
| 2 || 22 || 40 || 26 || 170 || 69 || 239 || 94 || 27 || 214 || 1.8 || 1.2 || 7.7 || 3.1 || 10.9 || 4.3 || 1.2 || 9.7
|- style="background-color: #EAEAEA"
! scope="row" style="text-align:center" | 2003
|
| 2 || 19 || 20 || 16 || 110 || 44 || 154 || 61 || 12 || 163 || 1.1 || 0.8 || 5.8 || 2.3 || 8.1 || 3.2 || 0.6 || 8.6
|-
! scope="row" style="text-align:center" | 2004
|
| 5 || 14 || 17 || 9 || 89 || 28 || 117 || 55 || 23 || 146 || 1.2 || 0.6 || 6.4 || 2.0 || 8.4 || 3.9 || 1.6 || 10.4
|-
! scope="row" style="text-align:center" | 2005
|
| 5 || 0 || 0 || 0 || 0 || 0 || 0 || 0 || 0 || 0 || 0.0 || 0.0 || 0.0 || 0.0 || 0.0 || 0.0 || 0.0 || 0.0
|- class="sortbottom"
! colspan=3| Career
! 237
! 310
! 202
! 2135
! 877
! 3012
! 1201
! 170
! 2146
! 1.3
! 0.9
! 9.0
! 3.7
! 12.7
! 5.1
! 0.7
! 9.1
|}

References

External links
 

Australian rules footballers from Victoria (Australia)
North Melbourne Football Club players
North Melbourne Football Club Premiership players
Carlton Football Club players
Leigh Matthews Trophy winners
1973 births
Living people
All-Australians (AFL)
John Nicholls Medal winners
Victorian State of Origin players
Two-time VFL/AFL Premiership players